Richard Jorif (1930–2010) was a French writer. He was born to an Indian father and a mother from Martinique. He published his first novel at the age of 57. The book titled Le Navire Argo won the Alain Fournier Prize. Other books include “Clownerie” (François Bourin, 1988), “Paul Valéry” (Lattès, 1991), and “Tohu-bohu” (Julliard, 2000). His last book in 2001 was a collection of short stories.

Works
 1987 : Le Navire Argo, roman (triptyque Frédéric Mops), éditions François Bourin
 1988 : Clownerie, éditions François Bourin
 1991 : Paul Valéry, éditions Lattès, 1991
 1991 : Le Burelain (triptyque Frédéric Mops), éditions Gallimard
 1992 : Les Persistants lilas
 2000 : Tohu-Bohu, roman (triptyque Frédéric Mops), éditions Julliard
 2001 : Qu'est-ce que la mort, Fourrure?, nouvelles, éditions le Cherche Midi

References

French writers
1930 births
2010 deaths